The 2015 New York City Marathon was the 45th running of the annual marathon race in New York City, United States, which took place on November 1. The event was organised by the New York Road Runners and sponsored by Tata Consultancy Services (TCS). The main race saw the third successive time that Kenyans won both races. Stanley Biwott won the men's division with a time of 2:10:34. His compatriot Mary Jepkosgei Keitany claimed the women's division with a time of 2:24:25, her second consecutive win in New York. In the wheelchair divisions, South African Ernst van Dyk won the men's division with a time of 1:30:54 and American Tatyana McFadden won the women's division with a new record of 1:43:04.

A total of 50,229 runners were registered to take part in the event. Amongst them, 49,828 runners finished the race, comprising 28,804 men and 21,024  women.

Course
The  course covers all five boroughs of New York City. It begins on Staten Island, in Fort Wadsworth, near the approach to the Verrazano-Narrows Bridge. The bridge, which normally carries only vehicular traffic, is closed for the event. Runners use both sides of the upper level of the bridge and the westbound side of the lower level. In the opening minutes of the race, the bridge is filled with runners, creating a dramatic spectacle that is closely associated with the event.

After descending the bridge, the course winds through Brooklyn, mostly along Fourth Avenue and Bedford Avenue, for approximately the next . Runners pass through a variety of neighborhoods, including: Bay Ridge, Sunset Park, Park Slope, Bedford-Stuyvesant, Williamsburg, and Greenpoint. At , runners cross the Pulaski Bridge, marking the halfway point of the race and the entrance into Long Island City, Queens.

It then proceeds south through Harlem down Fifth Avenue and into Central Park. At the southern end of the park, the race proceeds across Central Park South, where thousands of spectators cheer runners on during the last mile. At Columbus Circle, the race re-enters the park and finishes outside Tavern on the Green.

Race summary
The wheelchair division was scheduled to start at 8:30 a.m. EST, the women's division at 9:20 a.m., and the men's division at 9:50 a.m. The last wave of runners was scheduled to start at 11:00 a.m. The weather was generally overcast with negligible wind.

Women's division

The first runners hit the  point in 17:21 and the  mark in 34:27. By the halfway point (1:12:54), a nine-woman lead pack had emerged led by Portuguese runner Sara Moreira. They remained together until the  mark, where a group containing Kenyans Mary Jepkosgei Keitany and Priscah Jeptoo, along with Ethiopians Aselefech Mergia and Tigist Tufa started to pull away. At the  mark, Keitany increased her pace and began recording sub 5:20 miles. Tufa kept up with Keitany until the  point before falling away. Keitany won the race in 2:24:25, a full minute and seven seconds in front of second placed Mergia who had overtaken Tufa in the final mile. Tufa trailed a further eighteen seconds behind in third place. Keitany's win marked the first time a woman had defended the New York Marathon title since Briton Paula Radcliffe in 2008.

Singer-songwriter Alicia Keys completed a charity run of the course in 5:50:52.

Men's division

The first runners hit the  point in 15:47 and the  mark in 31:30. By the halfway point (1:06:49), a thirteen-man lead pack had emerged led by Ethiopian Lelisa Desisa. At the  mark, the lead pack had reduced to four, containing Kenyans Geoffrey Kamworor, Stanley Biwott and Wilson Kipsang Kiprotich, along with Desisa. Kamworor was fourteen seconds behind him to claim second and Desisa a further minute 22 seconds off in third.

Former professional tennis player James Blake finished the course in 3:51:19 and actor Ethan Hawke recorded a time of 4:25:30.

Results

Men

Women

† Ran in mass race

Wheelchair men

Wheelchair women

Handcycle men

Handcycle women

References 

Results
TCS New York City Marathon 2015. New York Road Runners. Retrieved 2020-05-06.
Men's results. Association of Road Racing Statisticians. Retrieved 2020-04-11.
Women's results. Association of Road Racing Statisticians. Retrieved 2020-04-11.

External links

New York Road Runners website

2015
New York City Marathon
Marathon
New York City Marathon